The Evergreen Formation is a Pliensbachian to Toarcian geologic formation of the Surat Basin in New South Wales and Queensland, eastern Australia. It is Upper Pliensbachian to Toarcian in age.

Fossil content 
The temnospondyl Siderops, Decorotergum warrenae and indeterminate plesiosaur fossils are known from the formation, deposited in a lacustrine environment.

References

Further reading 
 A. Warren. 1977. Jurassic labyrinthodont. Nature 265:436-437

Geologic formations of Australia
Jurassic System of Australia
Pliensbachian Stage
Toarcian Stage
Sandstone formations
Siltstone formations
Mudstone formations
Lacustrine deposits
Paleontology in New South Wales
Paleontology in Queensland